Robert Thomas Wagner (born 17 April 1983) is a German former professional cyclist, who competed professionally between 2006 and 2019 for the , Wiesenhof–Felt,  and  teams. He won the German National Road Race Championships in 2011, and was named in the start list for the 2016 Tour de France.

Wagner now works as a directeur sportif for UCI Continental team .

Major results

2005
 1st Stage 8 Thüringen Rundfahrt der U23
 2nd Time trial, National Under-23 Road Championships
2006
 3rd Ronde van Noord-Holland
 5th Rund um Düren
 5th Neuseen Classics
2007
 6th Schaal Sels
2008
 1st Ronde van Noord-Holland
 2nd Overall Delta Tour Zeeland
1st Stage 1
 4th Kampioenschap van Vlaanderen
 10th Trofeo Mallorca
2009
 2nd Omloop van het Houtland
 3rd Overall Delta Tour Zeeland
1st Stage 2
 5th Sparkassen Giro Bochum
 7th Ronde van Overijssel
 9th Overall Tour de Picardie
 9th Schaal Sels
2010
 1st Ronde van Noord-Holland
 1st Stage 2 Delta Tour Zeeland
 1st Stage 2 Bayern Rundfahrt
 3rd Münsterland Giro
 4th Overall Driedaagse van West-Vlaanderen
1st Stage 2
 8th Trofeo Palma de Mallorca
 8th Grote Prijs Stad Zottegem
2011
 1st  Road race, National Road Championships
 3rd Le Samyn
 3rd Grand Prix d'Isbergues
 8th Trofeo Cala Millor
2013
 1st Stage 1 (ITT) Ster ZLM Toer
 6th Overall Tour des Fjords
 6th Handzame Classic

Grand Tour general classification results timeline

References

External links

1983 births
Living people
German male cyclists
Sportspeople from Magdeburg
German cycling road race champions
Cyclists from Saxony-Anhalt
People from Bezirk Magdeburg
21st-century German people